Paola Saini (born 11 October 1945) is a retired Italian swimmer. She competed in various events at the 1960 and 1964 Summer Olympics and reached the final of the 4 × 100 m freestyle relay on both occasions. After retiring from competitions in 1966 she graduated in biology, and later taught in Italy, Turkey and Spain.

References

External links
 

1945 births
Italian female freestyle swimmers
Swimmers at the 1960 Summer Olympics
Swimmers at the 1964 Summer Olympics
Italian female swimmers
Olympic swimmers of Italy
Living people
People from Orta San Giulio
Sportspeople from the Province of Novara
20th-century Italian women